The 1986 NAIA men's basketball tournament was held in March at Kemper Arena in Kansas City, Missouri. The 49th annual NAIA basketball tournament featured 32 teams playing in a single-elimination format.

Awards and honors
Leading scorers:
Leading rebounder:
Player of the Year: est. 1994.

Bracket

  * denotes overtime.

See also
1986 NAIA women's basketball tournament
1986 NCAA Division I men's basketball tournament
1986 NCAA Division II men's basketball tournament
1986 NCAA Division III men's basketball tournament

References

NAIA Men's Basketball Championship
Tournament
NAIA men's basketball tournament
NAIA men's basketball tournament
College basketball tournaments in Missouri
Basketball competitions in Kansas City, Missouri